Angelo Ndrecka (born 24 September 2001) is an Albanian footballer who plays as leftback for Italian  club Pro Patria.

Club career
Ndrecka made his professional debut for Chievo in a 4-0 Serie A loss to SPAL on 4 May 2019.

On 17 July 2019, Ndrecka signed with a deal with Lazio. He was assigned to their Under-19 squad.

On 31 August 2021 he joined Teramo on loan.

On 13 July 2022 he joined Pro Patria on permanent basis.

International career
Ndrecka was born in Italy to Albanian parents from Kavajë. Ndrecka represented the Albania U19s in a friendly in November 2018.

References

External links

Fox Sports Profile
Lega Serie A Profile

2001 births
Living people
People from Desenzano del Garda
Footballers from Lombardy
Italian people of Albanian descent
Albanian footballers
Italian footballers
Association football fullbacks
Serie A players
Serie C players
A.C. ChievoVerona players
S.S. Lazio players
S.S. Teramo Calcio players
Aurora Pro Patria 1919 players
Albania youth international footballers
Albania under-21 international footballers
Sportspeople from the Province of Brescia